Pleurothallis anthrax is a species of orchid native to southern Colombia and Venezuela.

References

anthrax
Flora of Colombia
Flora of Venezuela